The 2011–12 Slovenian PrvaLiga was the 21st season of the Slovenian PrvaLiga, the top-tier football league in Slovenia. The season began on 16 July 2011 and ended on 26 May 2012, with a winter break in effect between 4 December 2011 and 2 March 2012. Maribor were the defending champions, having won their ninth title the previous season.

Teams

Primorje were directly relegated at the end of the 2010–11 season to the Slovenian Second League after the last-place finish. They were replaced by the 2010–11 Slovenian Second League fourth-placed team, Mura 05, who participated in the competition for the first time in their history. Mura 05 received and accepted an invitation to join the league after Aluminij, Interblock and Dravinja – who finished in the top three places – all declined promotion due to financial reasons.

With both Nafta and Mura 05 participating in the 2011–12 edition, Prekmurje region had two teams in the top division for the first time since the 1999–2000 season.

Stadia and locations

1Seating capacity only. Some stadiums (e.g. Mura 05, Nafta, Rudar) also have standing areas.

League table

Positions by round

Relegation play-offs
The ninth-placed team played a two-legged relegation play-off against the runners-up of the 2011–12 Slovenian Second League. Although Triglav lost the two-legged play-off against Dob, they retained their place in the PrvaLiga as Dob declined promotion due to financial reasons.

Results
Every team plays four times against their opponents, twice at home and twice on the road, for a total of 36 matches.

First half of the season

Second half of the season

Statistics

Top goalscorers

Hat-tricks

Average attendance

See also
2011 Slovenian Supercup
2011–12 Slovenian Football Cup
2011–12 Slovenian Second League

References
General

Specific

External links
Official website of the PrvaLiga 

Slovenian PrvaLiga seasons
Slovenian
1